Amber Jamilla Musser is an English professor at the CUNY Graduate Center.  Musser is also Associate Professor of Women, Gender, and Sexuality Studies at Washington University in St. Louis.

Early life and education
From the University of Oxford, Musser has a MSt in Women's Studies and her Ph.D. from Harvard is in the History of Science. She has had fellowships at the Pembroke Center for Teaching and Research on Women at Brown University and at the New York University Draper Program in Gender Studies.

Career
According to her profile on the CUNY site, her research interests are Critical race theory, black feminism and queer of color critique narrative. According to her Washington University in St. Louis profile, it "is at the intersection of race, gender, and sexuality studies."

Musser joined the CUNY staff in the fall semester of 2021.  Musser was also an American Studies professor at George Washington University.

At Washington University, where she started in 2013, Musser taught in both the Women, Gender and Sexuality Studies Department, Performing Arts Department and American Cultural Studies Program.

Publications
monograph Sensational Flesh: Race, Power, and Masochism (NYU Press, 2014)
Sensual Excess: Queer Femininity and Brown Jouissance
Tear and the Politics of Brown Feelings

References

Graduate Center, CUNY faculty
Washington University in St. Louis faculty
George Washington University faculty
Alumni of the University of Oxford
Harvard University alumni
LGBT academics
Year of birth missing (living people)
Living people
LGBT educators